Live in Athens is a 2005 DVD release by progressive metal band Fates Warning.

Track listing
Live Show:
 "One" – 4:39 (from Disconnected)
 "A Pleasant Shade of Gray Pt. III" – 3:36 (from A Pleasant Shade of Gray)
 "Life in Still Water" – 5:37 (from Parallels)
 "Simple Human" – 3:55 (from FWX)
 "Heal Me" – 4:22 (from FWX)
 "Pieces of Me" – 4:16 (from Disconnected)
 "Face the Fear" – 5:03 (from Inside Out)
 "Quietus" – 3:58 (from No Exit)
 "Another Perfect Day" – 4:12 (from FWX)
 "A Pleasant Shade of Gray Pt. XI" – 3:41 (from A Pleasant Shade of Gray)
 "The Eleventh Hour" – 8:06 (from Parallels)
 "Point of View" – 5:11 (from Parallels)
 "Monument" – 6:50 (from Inside Out)
 "Still Remains" – 15:37 (from Disconnected)
 "Nothing Left to Say" – 7:58 (from Perfect Symmetry)

Behind the Scenes
 "Excerpts from Bulgarian TV"
 "Athens Rehearsal"
 "Athens Soundcheck"

Holland Headway Festival 2005
 "Another Perfect Day"
 "The Eleventh Hour"

Personnel

 Ray Alder - vocals
 Jim Matheos - guitars
Frank Aresti - guitars
 Joey Vera - bass
 Nick D'Virgilio - drums
 Kevin Moore - keyboards on "Still Remains"

References

Fates Warning albums
2005 live albums
Live video albums
2005 video albums
Inside Out Music live albums
Inside Out Music video albums